Rashad Robinson is an American civil rights leader. He is the president of Color of Change, an advocacy group. He has served as a board member of RaceForward, Demos, State Voices, and currently sits on the board of the Hazen Foundation.

Early career 
After graduating from Marymount College in the early 1990s, Robinson held leadership roles at GLAAD, as Senior Director of Media Programs leading the organization's advocacy and major media campaigns, the Right to Vote Campaign, and FairVote.

Color of Change (2011 - present) 
In 2011, Rashad Robinson became the president of Color of Change, an advocacy organization founded after Hurricane Katrina with the purpose of assisting black communities in America.

During Robinson's tenure as president, Color Of Change has grown by one million members and expanded to four offices in New York, Washington, D.C., Los Angeles, and Oakland, California.

Robinson organized many of the organization's initiatives, including a campaign to pull funding from the American Legislative Exchange Council. American Legislative Exchange Council is responsible for the "Stand Your Ground" laws implicated in the 2012 death of Trayvon Martin.

Color Of Change helped protect the principle of net neutrality by pushing the FCC to reclassify broadband as a common carrier service. The organization's Winning Justice campaign pushes prosecutors to reduce incarceration, end the use of money bail, and change sentencing schemes under which hundreds of thousands of Black people are imprisoned in the US. The group has also persuaded businesses, including Mastercard and PayPal, to stop accepting payments from white nationalist groups, and business leaders to refrain from sitting on President Trump's Business Council.

Color Of Change is credited with working with Silicon Valley companies including Airbnb, Google and Facebook to improve diversity inside their companies and address policies that harm Black users. Their media and Hollywood teams also work to get content they deem racist and inaccurate taken off air; they have gotten several reality TV shows (All My Babies' Mamas, COPS) and conservative hosts (Bill O'Reilly, Glenn Beck) canceled.

In 2016, the Stanford Social Innovation Review wrote about Color Of Change's integrated online/offline strategies for “pursuing the fight for racial justice at Internet speed.” In 2015, Fast Company named Color Of Change the 6th Most Innovative Company in the World, and named Color Of Change the 2nd Most Innovative Company in the nonprofit sector in 2018.

Media appearances and recognition 
From 2010 to 2014, Robinson was selected as one of "The Root 100," a list of emerging and influential African Americans under 45.

Robinson regularly appears in the media, including NPR, MSNBC, CNN, PBS, and BET. He has a monthly column in the US edition of The Guardian. His editorials have been published by The New York Times, Huffington Post, The Washington Post, and USA Today.

In March 2015, Ebony Magazine called Robinson one of several "breakthrough leaders who have stepped up and are moving forward in the perpetual fight for justice." In May 2015, Huffington Post included Robinson in a series highlighting "some of the people and issues that will shape the world in the next decade."  The same month, Robinson received an honorary doctoral degree from St. Mary's College of Maryland.

In 2016, the Stanford Social Innovation Review wrote about Color Of Change's integrated online/offline strategies for “pursuing the fight for racial justice at Internet speed.” In 2015, Fast Company named Color Of Change the 6th Most Innovative Company in the World, and named Color Of Change the 2nd Most Innovative Company in the nonprofit sector in 2018.

On September 25, 2020, Robinson was named as one of the 25 members of the "Real Facebook Oversight Board", an independent monitoring group over Facebook.

Personal life 
Robinson grew up in Riverhead, Long Island, and graduated from Riverhead High School in 1997.  He began practicing activism as a high school student when he led a protest against a local convenience store that barred students from entering the store during their lunch break. He also became involved with the NAACP while in high school.

Robinson attended Marymount University where he obtained a bachelor's degree in political science.

Robinson lives in New York City.

References

African-American non-fiction writers
American non-fiction writers
Activists for African-American civil rights
Living people
Marymount University alumni
People from Riverhead (town), New York
21st-century African-American people
1979 births